Gianni Giansanti (1956 – March 18, 2009) was a long-time photographer of Pope John Paul II. Giansanti also covers news in Guatemala, Lebanon, Senegal and Somalia. His reports were awarded the World Press in 1978, 1988 and 1991.

References 

Italian photographers
1956 births
2009 deaths